Francisco de Tutavilla y del Tufo, Duque de San Germán, (Naples, Italy, 1604 – Madrid, Spain, 30 January 1679), Commander of Peñausende from the Spanish Military Order of Santiago and Sieur of Campana de Albalá and Saucedilla, was an Italian - Spanish military and Viceroy, serving Kings Philip IV of Spain and Charles II of Spain.

Biography

At the time of the Portuguese Restoration War, 1657–1663, he was a General of the Extremadura Army fighting at the Sieges of Olivenza, Badajoz and Monção. His troops were defeated at Elvas, in 1659, and heavily defeated at Ameixial, in 1663, which ended his participation in the campaign of Portugal.

From April 1664 until February 1668, he was Viceroy of Navarre. At the end of 1668, he was the successor of the assassinated Viceroy of Sardinia, Manuel de los Cobos, 4th Marquis of Camarasa, a post he held until January 1673. 
He then became Viceroy of Catalonia, (August 1673 - October 1675).

In 1674 he captured the Fort de Bellegarde, held by the French since the Peace of the Pyrenees of 1659 between France and Spain, and won the Battle of Maureillas over a French army led by Frederick Schomberg, 1st Duke of Schomberg. The eruption of a revolt in Messina against the Spanish rule in 1675, however, forced him to send many of his troops to suppress the rebellion, and Schomberg was able to take back Bellegarde.

Duke Francisco de Tutavilla y del Tufo was married to a Spanish noblewoman, mainly of Portuguese ancestors, Catalina de Cárdenas Colón de Toledo y Portugal, 14th Countess of la Puebla del Maestre and 5th Marchioness of Bacares, who died in Madrid on 4 January 1701. The couple had no children.

References

Sources
 http://www.nobili-napoletani.it/Tufo.htm
 http://www.genmarenostrum.com/pagine-lettere/letterat/del%20Tufo/DEL%20TUFO-LAVELLO.htm

1604 births
1679 deaths
Italian nobility
17th-century Neapolitan people
Spanish generals
Viceroys of Navarre
Viceroys of Sardinia
Viceroys of Catalonia
Dukes of San Germán
Order of Santiago